Serebryansky is a rural locality (a khutor) in Krasnooktyabrskoye Rural Settlement, Alexeyevsky District, Volgograd Oblast, Russia. The population was 77 as of 2010.

Geography 
Serebryansky is located 23 km east of Alexeyevskaya (the district's administrative centre) by road. Krasny Oktyabr is the nearest rural locality.

References 

Rural localities in Alexeyevsky District, Volgograd Oblast